The Cure is a live album by American pianist Keith Jarrett's "Standards Trio" featuring Gary Peacock and Jack DeJohnette recorded in concert in April, 1990 at The Town Hall in New York City and released by ECM Records in October, 1991.

Reception 
The Allmusic review by Richard S. Ginell awarded the album 4 stars, and states, "one's reservations fade when confronted with the sheer creativity and empathy that the trio displayed in this gorgeously recorded live date... first-class improvisational jazz".

Track listing
 "Bemsha Swing" (Thelonious Monk, Denzil Best) - 9:43  
 "Old Folks" (Deddette Lee Hill, Willard Robison) - 11:18  
 "Woody 'n' You" (Dizzy Gillespie) - 6:38  
 "Blame It on My Youth" (Edward Heyman, Oscar Levant) - 8:16  
 "Golden Earrings" (Ray Evans, Jay Livingston, Victor Young) - 8:31  
 "Body and Soul" (Edward Heyman, Robert Sour, Frank Eyton, Johnny Green) - 13:26  
 "The Cure" (Keith Jarrett) - 10:31  
 "Things Ain't What They Used to Be" (Mercer Ellington) - 9:11  
Total effective playing time: 1:13:23 (the album contains 4:13 applause approximately)

Personnel 
 Keith Jarrett – piano
 Gary Peacock - bass
 Jack DeJohnette - drums

Production
 Manfred Eicher - producer
 Jan Erik Kongshaug - engineer (recording)
 Kuni Shinohara - photography
 Barbara Wojirsch - cover design

References 

Standards Trio albums
Gary Peacock live albums
Jack DeJohnette live albums
Keith Jarrett live albums
1991 live albums
ECM Records live albums
Albums produced by Manfred Eicher
Albums recorded at the Town Hall